Quebecair  was a Canadian airline that operated from 1947 until 1986. Quebecair was headquartered in Saint-Laurent, Quebec, now a part of Montreal.

History

Early years

Quebecair began as Rimouski Airlines in 1947 and flew under that name until it merged with Gulf Aviation in 1953 under the name Quebec-Air.  The aircraft in operation at the time were the Beech 18, the de Havilland Canada DHC-2 Beaver and the Douglas DC-3.  Operations were mainly based in Quebec and Montreal was added in 1957.  Eventually the latter city became the operating base for Quebecair.

In 1958 a fire in a hangar destroyed three DC-3s and Fairchild F-27 turboprop aircraft were then purchased to replace the destroyed aircraft.  The F-27 propjets proved to be very successful.  As operations increased, the company introduced a new, larger aircraft in the form of the Convair CV-540 turboprop, which were put  on the main route between Montreal and Quebec.  In later years, Quebecair also operated the Convair 580 turboprop.

During the 1960s, the company took over various airlines as Matane Air Service, Northern Wings, RoyalAir and Northern Wings Helicopter in 1965.  The increase in operations brought the introduction of the first jet aircraft, the British Aircraft Corporation BAC One-Eleven, which were put into use on the Montreal - Toronto route in 1969.

Later years

The company took over Air Gaspé in 1973 and acquired more northern routes.  In 1974 it bought two Boeing 707s for charter work and also Boeing 727-100 aircraft.  It conducted charter flights to destinations in Florida, the Caribbean, Europe and Hawaii.  Charter flights were discontinued in 1979 and the 707s were sold off.  According to the February 1976 and November 1979 Official Airline Guides (OAG), Quebecair operated the Boeing 727-100 jetliner in scheduled passenger operations between Montreal, Quebec City and other destinations in Quebec and Newfoundland provinces.

By 1981 the financial conditions in Quebecair had become difficult.  All aircraft models except for the Fairchild F-27 turboprops and BAC One-Eleven jets were sold.  This was a difficult time for Quebecair and other airlines.  It did not introduce the Boeing 737-200 until 1983 when the 737s began replacing the BAC One-Elevens. The 111's were gone by 1985.

In 1984 Quebecair leased two  Douglas DC-8-63s for transatlantic charter flights, but these stretched Super DC-8s were not operated very long and merged with Regionair. According to the October 1985 Quebecair timetable, the airline was operating scheduled passenger flights on two international routes, being Montreal-Boston and Quebec City-New York City.

1985 was a very difficult year for Quebecair as the airline industry in Canada was restructuring.  The financial situation at the carrier forced the Quebec government (which had owned the airline for several years) to sell the company to CP Air in July 1986.  In continuing consolidation involving several other Canadian air carriers, Pacific Western Airlines notably purchased and took over CP Air, which then became Canadian Airlines International in 1987.

Destinations

The 1980 route map lists the following Canadian destinations being served:

Gagnon, Quebec
Montreal, Quebec - Montreal Dorval Airport and Montreal-Mirabel International Airport
Quebec City, Quebec
Toronto, Ontario
Schefferville, Quebec
Wabush, Newfoundland and Labrador
Sept-Îles, Quebec
Havre-Saint-Pierre, Quebec
Baie-Johan-Beetz, Quebec
Natashquan, Quebec
Kegaska, Quebec
Chevery Airport, Quebec
Churchill Falls Airport, Newfoundland
Harrington Harbour, Quebec
Tête-à-La-Baleine Airport, Quebec
Bagotville, (Saguenay), Quebec
Blanc-Sablon, Quebec
Port-Menier, Quebec
Îles de la Madeleine, Quebec
Bonaventure, Quebec
Gaspé, Quebec
Rimouski, Quebec
Baie-Comeau, Quebec
Saguenay, Quebec
Rouyn-Noranda, Quebec
Val-d'Or, Quebec

And in the United States:

Boston, Massachusetts
New York City, New York (via Newark Liberty International Airport in New Jersey)

Fleet

Jet aircraft

Boeing 707-123B (used for passenger charter services only)
Boeing 727-100 (B727-025 model)
Boeing 737-200
British Aircraft Corporation BAC One-Eleven
Douglas DC-8-63 (stretched Super DC-8 used for passenger charter services only)
Douglas DC-8-54F (used to transport cargo only)
Fokker F28 Fellowship

Turboprop aircraft

Convair 540
Convair 580
 de Havilland Canada DHC-6 Twin Otter
Fairchild F-27
Hawker Siddeley HS 748

Piston aircraft

Beechcraft 18
Britten-Norman BN-2 Islander
Consolidated PBY (Canso model amphibian aircraft)
Cessna T-50 (operated by predecessor Rimouski Airlines)
Curtiss C-46 Commando (used to transport cargo only)
de Havilland Canada DHC-2 Beaver
de Havilland Canada DHC-3 Otter
Douglas DC-3 (also operated the C-47 model)
Douglas DC-4

Accidents and incidents
 On December 14, 1972, Quebecair Flight 321 was hijacked by Larry Maxwell Stanford.  Stanford boarded the flight in Wabush, Newfoundland, and took control of the aircraft with a .22 caliber rifle. He forced the pilots to fly to Montreal, then to Ottawa, and finally back to Montreal. Stewardess Josette Côté Dishongh was credited with talking Stanford into releasing the passengers and then surrendering at Montreal after the 10-hour ordeal.
 On February 19, 1979, Quebecair Flight 714, a Boeing 707-123B C-GQBH operating a flight from Toronto, caught a wind shear while on approach to Hewanorra international airport in St. Lucia. The windshear caused the aircraft to halt its descent while already over the threshold. The copilot who was flying at that time retarded the throttles, however at that very moment the aircraft had passed the windshear zone and the nose of the aircraft slammed into the runway and bounced twice, destroying the nose landing gear. There were no fatalities and minor injuries in this incident. The aircraft was damaged beyond repair and was written off.
 On March 29, 1979, Quebecair Flight 255, a Fairchild F-27 (tail number: CF-QBL) flying from Quebec City to Montreal crashed after an engine exploded shortly after take off, killing all three crew and 17 out of 21 passengers.

See also 
 List of defunct airlines of Canada

References

External links

  
   (Subscription required to view full article)
  
  

 
Defunct airlines of Canada
Airlines established in 1946
Airlines disestablished in 1987
Companies based in Montreal
Saint-Laurent, Quebec
1946 establishments in Quebec
Defunct seaplane operators